Catherine Herridge (born May 18, 1964) is a CBS News senior investigative correspondent currently based in Washington D.C. She began her role at CBS in November 2019 after leaving her role as Chief Intelligence correspondent for Fox News Channel. She had hosted the Saturday edition of Weekend Live.

Early life and education
Herridge was born in Toronto, Ontario and attended Jarvis Collegiate Institute for high school before moving to the US for college.

Herridge earned a Bachelor’s degree from Harvard College and a Master’s degree in journalism from the Columbia University Graduate School of Journalism.

Career

In journalism
Joining the Fox News Channel at its inception in 1996, she originally was a London-based correspondent for ABC News. Herridge has also served as a field correspondent for the defunct Fox newsmagazine The Pulse.

At Fox, she covered Hillary Clinton almost exclusively, including Clinton's campaign for Senate in 2000, the 2004 Democratic presidential elections, the Washington, D.C.-area sniper attacks, the U.S.-sponsored resolution calling for the lifting of sanctions against Iraq, and the trial of Zacarias Moussaoui, the only person charged in the U.S. over the 9/11 attacks.

Herridge was in New York on September 11, 2001, and reported for the network from locations in New York City.

On October 31, 2019 Fox News announced Catherine Herridge would be leaving the network, shortly after being awarded the Tex McCrary Award for Journalism from the Congressional Medal of Honor Society for her enterprise reporting at Fox News.

She then joined CBS News as a senior investigative correspondent.

Author
In 2011, Herridge authored The Next Wave: On the Hunt for Al Qaeda's American Recruits.

Personal life
On June 6, 2006, she donated a portion of her liver to her infant son who was diagnosed with biliary atresia.

References

External links
 

Living people
1964 births
Place of birth missing (living people)
American expatriates in the United Kingdom
American television journalists
American women television journalists
CBS News people
Columbia University Graduate School of Journalism alumni
Harvard College alumni
Organ transplant donors
Fox News people
21st-century American women